José Mauricio Alpízar Castro (born 30 January 1979 in Alajuela) is a retired Costa Rican professional footballer.

Club career
Alpízar played for Herediano, whom he rejoined from Santa Bárbara, Puntarenas, for whom he scored a hattrick against Liberia in April 2005, and Liberia Mía in the Primera Division de Costa Rica.

International career
Alpízar made three appearances for Costa Rica, at the UNCAF Nations Cup 2003.

Alpízar has also played for Costa Rica at 1999 FIFA World Youth Championship in Nigeria.

References

External links
 
 Profile at Nacion 

1979 births
Living people
People from Alajuela
Costa Rican footballers
Costa Rica international footballers
Costa Rica under-20 international footballers
Liga FPD players
C.S. Herediano footballers
Puntarenas F.C. players
Municipal Liberia footballers
2003 UNCAF Nations Cup players
Copa Centroamericana-winning players
Association football midfielders